Ephemeral is a corporate chain of tattoo studios that has raised millions from venture capital investors. Their tattoos are supposed to fade in 9 to 15 months. The company was founded by five students at New York University, Seung Shin, Vandan Shah, Joshua Sakhai, Brennal Pierre, and Anthony Lam. two of whom invented Ephemeral’s ink.

Ephemeral’s ink is made of bioabsorbable polymer particles that are supposed to break down over time; they are designed to get smaller and smaller until they dissolve through the blood.

Concerns
Customers have complained that their Ephemeral tattoos do not fade, even after fifteen to nineteen months. In response to these concerns, ink co-inventor Brennal Pierre stated:

Dr. Roy Grekin, director of the Dermatologic Surgery and Laser Center at UC San Francisco stated he wasn’t surprised to hear that different people experienced different fade times with Ephemeral tattoos.

Co-founder Joshua Sakhai stated:

Contests
In 2015, Ephemeral won first place in the $200K Entrepreneurs Challenge  and in 2016, Inc. (magazine) named the company the Coolest College Startup.

References 

Tattooing